The Scheibe Bergfalke (German: "mountain hawk") is a German glider designed by Egon Scheibe as a post-World War II development of the Akaflieg München Mü13 produced before and during the war.

Design and development
The prototype flew on 5 August 1951 as the Akaflieg München Mü13E Bergfalke I and by the end of the year, Scheibe had established his own works at the Munich-Riem Airport to produce the type as the Bergfalke II. It was a mid-wing sailplane of conventional design with a non-retractable monowheel undercarriage and a tailskid. The fuselage was a welded steel structure covered in fabric and enclosed two seats in tandem. The wings had a single wooden spar and were covered in plywood.

Subsequent versions introduced forward sweep to the wings, a more aerodynamic canopy, airbrakes, and a tailwheel in place of the tailskid. By 1982, Scheibe had built over 300 of these aircraft, and Stark Ibérica built a number of the Bergfalke III version under license in Spain. Scheibe also developed a motorglider version as the Bergfalke IVM but this did not enter production.

In 1976, two Bergfalke motorgliders participated in the Sixth German Motor Glider Competition. Later, one of these aircraft set a world 300 km triangle record.

Variants
Mü13E Bergfalke I
Prototype
Bergfalke II
First production version, 4° forward sweep on wings
Bergfalke II/55
Skopil Bergfalke II/55
Motorglider conversion done by Arnold Skopil of Aberdeen, Washington, United States in 1957. One converted.
Bergfalke III
Streamlined canopy, taller fin and rudder, Schempp-Hirth airbrakes, 2° forward sweep on wings
Bergfalke IV
Wing of Wortmann section with 60-cm (2-ft) greater span
Bergfalke IVM
Motorglider version with 39-kW (52-hp) Hirth O-28 engine mounted on retractable pylon behind cockpit.

Specifications (Bergfalke II/55)

See also

Notes

References

External links

 Bergfalke described on sailplanedirectory.com

1950s German sailplanes
Glider aircraft
Bergfalke
Shoulder-wing aircraft
Aircraft first flown in 1951